The 2022 season was FC Seoul's 39th in the K League 1. For the 3rd consecutive season, FC Seoul wasn't able to end the K League 1 at the Championship Round, leaving them a K League 1 Relegation Round spot. They finished in 9th place, escaping relegation play-offs at their last match, after winning 2–0 past Suwon FC. They didn't participated –or qualified to participate– in the 2022 AFC Champions League. Their final chance of reaching the 2023–24 AFC Champions League was via the 2022 Korean FA Cup, where they played a two-legged final against Jeonbuk Hyundai Motors, losing on aggregate score. Overall, no titles were won by FC Seoul in the season.

Pre-season
 First Winter Training Camp: In Namhae County, South Gyeongsang Province, South Korea - From 1 January 2022 to 25 January 2022

 Second Winter Training Camp: In Geoje and South Gyeongsang Province, South Korea - From 29 January 2022 to 6 February 2022

 Third Winter Training Camp: In Yeongdeok County and North Gyeongsang Province, South Korea - From 7 February 2022 to 11 February 2022

Pre-season match results

Competitions

Overview

K League 1

League table

Results summary

Results by round

Matches

FA Cup

Coaching staff

Players

Team squad
 All players registered for the 2022 season are listed.

Out on loan and military service

Transfers

In

Out

See also
 FC Seoul

References

External links
 FC Seoul official website 

FC Seoul seasons
South Korean football clubs 2022 season